"Blah Blah Blah" is a song performed by Dutch DJ and record producer Armin van Buuren. It was released on 18 May 2018 by the label Armada Music and Armind, as the first single from the EP of the same name. Currently, the video of "Blah Blah Blah" on YouTube has more than 599 million views.

The track was written by van Buuren, British singer and songwriter BullySongs (Andrew Bullimore), and Josh Record, and the vocals were performed by Bullimore's younger son Aidan.

Track listing
Digital download
"Blah Blah Blah" – 3:04
"Blah Blah Blah" (extended mix) – 6:06
"Blah Blah Blah" (acapella) – 1:30
 
Digital download – remixes
"Blah Blah Blah" (Bassjackers extended remix) – 4:18
"Blah Blah Blah" (Alyx Ander extended remix) – 4:44
"Blah Blah Blah" (Brennan Heart and Toneshifterz extended remix) – 4:44
"Blah Blah Blah" (Kid Comet extended remix) – 3:10
"Blah Blah Blah" (Zany extended remix) – 4:20
"Blah Blah Blah" (Tru Concept extended remix) – 3:26

Charts

Weekly charts

Year-end charts

Certifications

Other uses
Dutch association football club AFC Ajax play an excerpt of the song after every goal scored at their training ground Sportpark De Toekomst for youth leagues. The song was first played during 2019 edition of the under-17 Future Cup tournament following the successful use of the song in a marketing campaign by Ajax TV ahead of the 2018–19 UEFA Champions League quarterfinals against Juventus. Parts of the song were also used in the trailer for Netflix's 6 Underground (film) directed by Michael Bay.

References

 

2018 singles
Armin van Buuren songs
AFC Ajax songs
2018 songs
Songs written by Armin van Buuren
Armada Music singles
Songs written by Josh Record
Songs written by Andrew Bullimore